Academy of Economics in Białystok was opened on January 5, 1996.  It is a non-governmental collegiate-level institution of higher education in the city of Białystok (wyższa uczelnia), one of several such institutions including the largest University of Białystok locally. The academy was ranked in 2008 by the Polish edition of Newsweek as best in the Podlaskie Voivodeship. It offers bachelor's and master's degrees in three general fields of knowledge, as well as one-year postgraduate studies.

Organizational structure
Bachelor's and master's degree programmes
 Economy (Ekonomii)
 Work higene and safety (Bezpieczeństwa i Higieny Pracy)
 International relations (Stosunków Międzynarodowych)
Postgraduate studies 
 Finances and accounting (Finansów i Rachunkowości)
 Statistical methods (Metod Ilościowych i Informatyki)
 Politics of economy (Polityki Ekonomicznej, Społecznej i Regionalnej)
 Management and marketing (Zarządzania, Marketingu i Prawa)
 Economic development (Zrównoważonego Rozwoju i Gospodarki Opartej na Wiedzy)
 Departments o Foreign languages & physical education (Studium Języków Obcych i Studium Wychowania Fizycznego)

External links

Notes and references

Universities and colleges in Białystok
1996 establishments in Poland
Educational institutions established in 1996